Ithobaal I is the name of a 9th-century BCE king of Tyre mentioned in the story of Jezebel from the Hebrew Bible, and in a citation by Josephus of a list of the kings of Tyre put together by the Phoenician author Menander of Ephesus (2nd century BCE).

Ithobaal is listed as the founder of a new dynasty. During his reign, Tyre expanded its power on the mainland, making all of Phoenicia its territory as far north as Beirut, including Sidon, and even a part of the island of Cyprus. At the same time, Tyre also built new overseas colonies: Botrys (now Batrun) near Byblos, and Auza in Libya.

Sources and chronology
Primary information related to Ithobaal comes from Josephus's citation of the Phoenician author Menander of Ephesus, in Against Apion i.18. Here it is said that the previous king, Phelles, “was slain by Ithobalus, the priest of Astarte, who reigned thirty-two years, and lived sixty-eight years; he was succeeded by his son Badezorus (Baal-Eser II).”

The dates given here are according to the work of F. M. Cross and other scholars who take 825 BC as the date of Dido's flight from her brother Pygmalion, after which she founded the city of Carthage in 814 BC. See the chronological justification for these dates in the Pygmalion article.

Relations to Ahab of Israel
Ithobaal held close diplomatic contacts with king Ahab of Israel.  relates that his daughter Jezebel married Ahab (874 – 853 BC), and Phoenician influence in Samaria and the other Israelite cities was extensive. In the First Kings passage, Ithobaal is labeled king of the Sidonians. At this time Tyre and Sidon were consolidated into one kingdom.

Indirect Assyrian sources
Tyre is not mentioned as an opponent of Shalmaneser III at the Battle of Qarqar in 853 BC, but twelve years later, in 841, Ithobaal's son Baal-Eser II gave tribute to the Assyrian monarch.

Doubts on historicity
For decades, it was believed Ithobaal was mentioned in the inscription found on the Ahiram sarcophagus as the titular king's heir; however, more recent transcriptions of the text reconstruct the heir's name as Pilsibaal and not Ithobaal — which has raised questions about Ithobaal's paternity and historicity.

See also
List of Kings of Tyre
Pygmalion
 Pedra da Gávea

Notes

References

Kings of Tyre
9th-century BC rulers
915 BC births
840s BC deaths
9th-century BC Phoenician people